Mpilo Njoloza (born 20 December 1988) is a South African cricketer. He was included in the Western Province squad for the 2016 Africa T20 Cup. In September 2018, he was named in Western Province's squad for the 2018 Africa T20 Cup. He was the leading wicket-taker in the 2018–19 CSA Provincial One-Day Challenge, with 24 dismissals in eight matches.

References

External links
 

1988 births
Living people
South African cricketers
Eastern Province cricketers
Western Province cricketers
Cricketers from East London, Eastern Cape